is a Japanese former swimmer. He competed in two events at the 1968 Summer Olympics.

References

External links
 

1946 births
Living people
Japanese male freestyle swimmers
Olympic swimmers of Japan
Swimmers at the 1968 Summer Olympics
20th-century Japanese people